= Botswana and the World Bank =

Botswana, a landlocked country in southern Africa, became a member of the World Bank on July 24, 1968. Since shortly after Botswana gained independence in 1966, the World Bank has supported Botswana's economic growth and helped to consolidate the country's economic gains. Botswana continues to be an active participant in World Bank projects, including the Integrated Transport Project and the Emergency Water Security and Efficiency Project, both introduced in March 2017. The World Bank's Country Partnership Framework (CPF) for Botswana supports Botswana's development goals by promoting private sector jobs, strengthening assets, and supporting effective resource management.

== Background ==
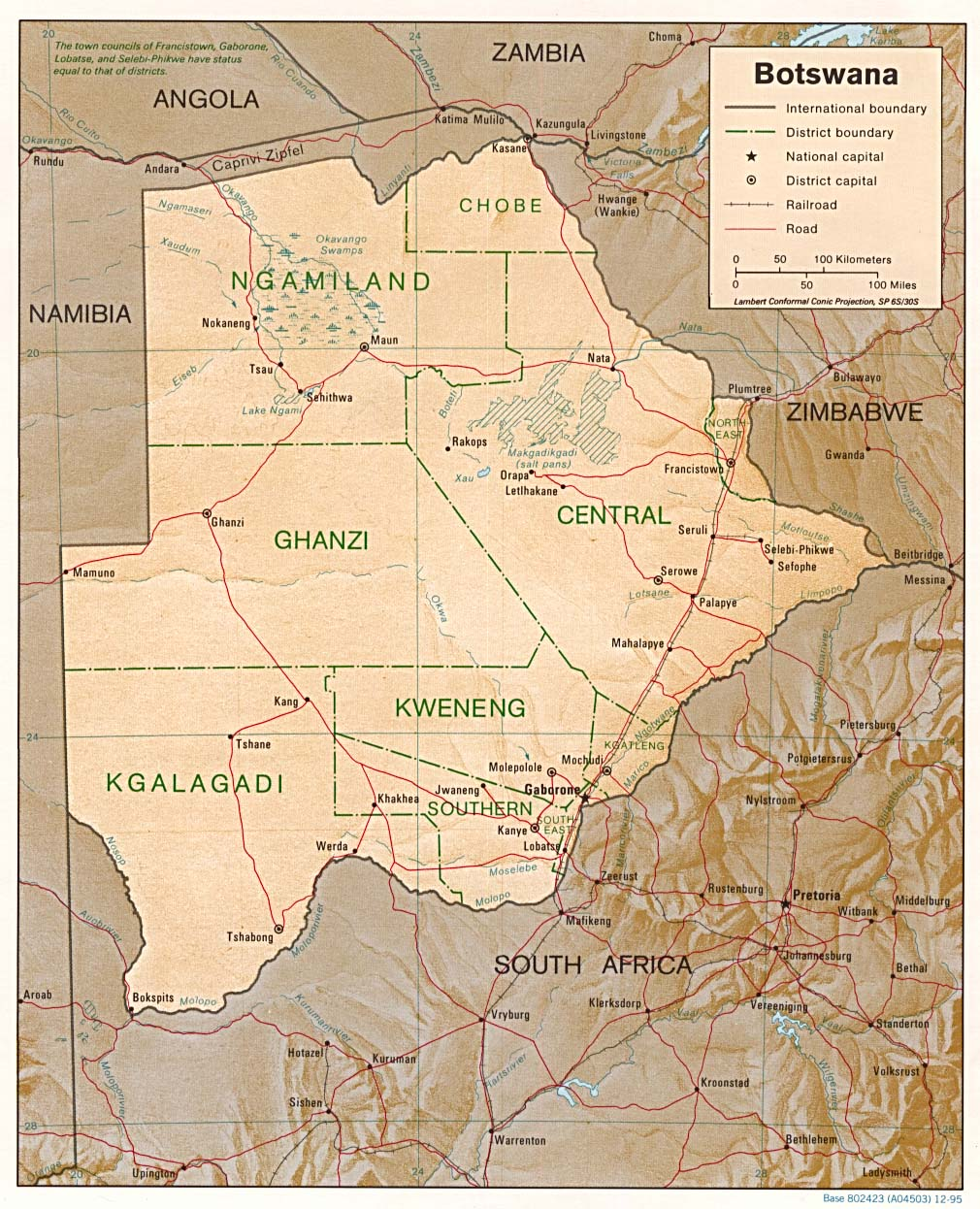
Map of Botswana

Botswana is located in the center of Southern Africa, between Zambia, Namibia and Zimbabwe. The Kalahari desert covers approximately 70% of the country.

Botswana was a part of the British empire, and was known as the British Protectorate of Bechuanaland before it gained independence within the Commonwealth in 1966. Since then, Botswana has experienced strong humanitarian, social growth and economic growth. Most of the economic growth is due to the production of diamonds, which allowed it to become an upper middle-income country. It is currently home to 2.3 million people.

== Relation with World Bank ==
Botswana first joined the World Bank on July 24, 1968, only 2 years after the country gained independence. Its first major project with the World Bank was a Roads and Water project, designed to develop the transportation system in the city of Bechuanaland. Since then, Botswana has looked to the World Bank to fund other projects that encompass the World Bank's goal for the country: to consolidate Botswana's progress while looking at a range of emerging issues and noting problem areas. Botswana is a strong US ally and has consistently worked with the World Bank to develop projects. Botswana's recent major projects include the Integrated Transport Project, estimated to cost $186 million, and the Emergency Water Security and Efficiency Project, estimated to cost $145.5 million. Both were introduced in March 2017 and are currently being worked on (as of 2020). Additional projects have focused on electricity transmission, economic diversification and strengthened public sector performance .

Botswana also has 2 projects in place with the International Finance Cooperation (IFC), a member of the World Bank group which helps to leverage private sector funding. One project, the IFC Kgalagadi Bond, will help to transform the Botswana Building Society (BBS) into a full-service, commercial bank which can finance underserved market segments, including small- and medium-sized enterprises (SMEs). Another project provides Public-Private Partnership (PPP) advisory support for the water sector; specifically for the Glen Valley Wastewater Treatment Plant.

Besides its funding mechanisms in Botswana, the World Bank provides analytical and advisory support.

=== Country Partnership Framework ===
Botswana currently has in place a Country Partnership Framework (CPF) for FY16-FY21. This framework provides a plan for the World Bank to work with Botswana to make a "country driven model more systematic, evidence-based, selective and focused on the bank's goals of ending extreme poverty and increasing shared prosperity." The focus of this framework is on promoting private sector jobs, strengthening assets and supporting effective resource management.

== Past development projects ==
=== The Botswana National HIV/AIDS Prevention Project ===
During the 2000s, Botswana was experiencing one of the most severe HIV/AIDS epidemics in the world. The government of Botswana declared a state of emergency and sought help from the World Bank. World Bank assistance helped Botswana to transition to a more strategic and sustainable approach. The main focus of this project was to strengthen the National AIDS agency's institutional management and coordination capacity and to finance strategic and innovative HIV/AIDS related prevention. The project ended in 2015 with a total cost of $50 million.

=== The Northern Botswana Human Wildlife Coexistence project ===
Botswana wanted a way to mitigate human and wildlife interventions in several rural communities, especially in Northern Botswana. Through this project, the government of Botswana was able to provide job opportunities in wildlife-based tourism to benefit the conservation of wildlife. This project was introduced in 2009 and ended in 2016. The cost of the project was $20.47 million.
